Lieke Wevers (born 17 September 1991) is a Dutch artistic gymnast. She has competed internationally as a senior since 2009. She was the first Dutch woman to win a European title in gymnastics: at the 2015 European Games, she won the gold medal on the balance beam and was the bronze medalist with the Dutch team, in the individual all-around, and on floor exercise. She also competed at the 2016 and 2020 Summer Olympics.

Personal life and training
Wevers was born on 17 September 1991, in Leeuwarden. She is six minutes younger than her fraternal twin, Sanne, who is an Olympic gold medalist. They are both members of the Dutch national gymnastics team and are coached by their father, Vincent Wevers.

In 1992, Wevers and her family moved to Oldenzaal. When she was 12, she and her sister started training with their father at a local club in Dronrijp. The family later moved to Twente, and the twins started training at Top Gymnastics Eastern Netherlands (Dutch: Topturnen Oost-Nederland). Her parents helped turn it into a high-level sports facility called BosanTON. In 2013, Vincent Wevers had an argument with the management of the facility and was fired. Ultimately, the twins moved with their father to Heerenveen to train, while their mother stayed in Oldenzaal.

Lieke studied psychology and speaks Dutch, English, German, and French.

Senior gymnastics career

2009–2012
Wevers' international debut was at the 2009 Cottbus World Cup, where she won silver on beam behind Marta Pihan-Kulesza of Poland and finished eighth on the uneven bars. However, at the 2009 European Championships, she tore her ACL and did not compete for another two years.

Wevers made her comeback to competition at the 2011 World Championships. In the qualification round, she competed on bars, beam, and floor to help the Dutch team finish in 13th. This result qualified them for the 2012 Olympic Test Event, but at the Test Event, the team finished in eighth and did not qualify for the Olympics. Afterward, Wevers had surgery on both of her wrists.

2013–2016
Wevers returned to competition in 2014. She competed at the 2014 European Championships with her sister, and they helped the Netherlands finish ninth. At the Dutch National Championships, she finished 11th in the all-around and fifth on beam. At the 2014 World Championships, Wevers helped the Dutch team finish tenth.

At the 2015 European Games, Wevers won a gold medal on the balance beam and bronze medals with the Dutch team, in the all-around, and on floor exercise. At the 2015 World Artistic Gymnastics Championships, she helped the Netherlands finish eighth in the team competition. Individually, she was 13th in the all-around and eighth on floor exercise.

In July 2016, Wevers was named to the Dutch team for the 2016 Summer Olympics. She helped the Netherlands finish seventh in the team competition and also qualified to the individual all-around final, where she finished 20th.

2017–present
In August 2019, Wevers competed at the Heerenveen Friendly where she helped the Netherlands win silver in the team competition behind Italy. Individually she finished seventh in the all-around but recorded the highest floor exercise score of the competition. The following month she competed at the Second Heerenveen Friendly where she helped the Netherlands finish first. Individually she placed fourth in the all-around behind compatriot Naomi Visser, Giulia Steingruber of Switzerland, and compatriot Eythora Thorsdottir.

In 2021, Wevers competed at the 2020 Summer Olympics. She finished 32nd in the all-around in qualifications and finished 24th in the all-around final.

Competitive history

References

1991 births
Living people
Dutch female artistic gymnasts
European Games gold medalists for the Netherlands
European Games bronze medalists for the Netherlands
European Games medalists in gymnastics
Gymnasts at the 2015 European Games
Gymnasts at the 2016 Summer Olympics
Gymnasts at the 2020 Summer Olympics
Olympic gymnasts of the Netherlands
Dutch twins
Twin sportspeople
Sportspeople from Leeuwarden
20th-century Dutch women
21st-century Dutch women